Theodore J. Aleixo Jr. (born August 23, 1942) is an American lawyer and politician from Massachusetts. He served in both houses of the Massachusetts General Court and as the Mayor of Taunton, Massachusetts.

Aleixo was elected to the Massachusetts House of Representatives in 1968 and served for 20 years.  During his time in the House, he simultaneously served as Mayor of Taunton from 1974 to 1976. In 1988, he was elected to one term in the Massachusetts Senate.

Aleixo Tiger Stadium at Taunton High School and the Aleixo Skating Arena in Taunton are named in his honor.

See also
 1977–1978 Massachusetts legislature
 1987–1988 Massachusetts legislature
 Massachusetts House of Representatives' 14th Bristol district

Notes 

1942 births
Boston University alumni
Suffolk University Law School alumni
Mayors of Taunton, Massachusetts
Democratic Party members of the Massachusetts House of Representatives
Democratic Party Massachusetts state senators
Living people